The Stud is a queer bar located in South of Market, San Francisco. It was started by associates George Matson and Alexis Muir (Alexis was a transgender woman then known as Richard Conroy) on May 27, 1966. According to George Matson it was a "bar for people, not just pretty bodies". Originally the Stud was located at 1535 Folsom Street; in 1987 it moved to its current location at Ninth and Harrison Streets. The Stud is known for its themed parties, drag and burlesque shows, and community events. It was also home of the famous Trannyshack, a weekly drag show that featured all different types of drag and drag stars from 1996 until 2008.

History and ownership 

The Stud was originally started by George Mason and Richard Conroy in 1966. (Richard Conroy was a transgender woman later known as Alexis Muir; this name may be a reference to John Muir, who was her great-uncle.) In the early 1970s, George sold his half to Richard. Richard then sold it to Jerry "Trixie" Jones, Heidi Steffan, and Jan Hill. Jerry "Trixie" Jones was also a partial owner of Hamburger Mary's, an iconic gay restaurant, across the street. In 1974, the Stud was bought out by Jim "Edie" Fleckenstein. Edie died in 1994, leaving the Stud to his partner and resident DJ Larry Holloway aka LaRue and his accountant Ben "Fiesta" Guibord. They then partnered up with Michael McElheney. LaRue died in the 1990s due to complications from HIV/AIDS. Ben "Fiesta" Guibord died in 2011, at the age of 63, also due to complications from HIV/AIDS. 

In the summer of 2016 the Stud was given a very large rent increase and Michael McElheney decided it was time to retire. When the bar was faced with closure, members of the local community began to organize in hopes of preserving the historic bar. This organizing resulted in the formation of a collective of nightlife professionals, which bought the business from Michael McElheney. Members of the collective include artists, DJs, and performers such as Honey Mahogany, Siobhan Aluvalot, Vivvyanne Forevermore, and Rachel Ryan. The collective took ownership of the Stud on December 30, 2016, making it, according to collective member Nate Allbee, "the very first co-op nightclub in the United States."

South of Market gay culture in the 1960s and the Stud's significance 
In the 1960s, San Francisco's primarily gay areas were Polk Street, the Tenderloin district, and South of Market. South of Market became the hub of the leather subculture in the gay community in 1961 when the gay bar the Tool Box opened its doors as the first leather bar in the neighborhood. When the Stud, along with Febe's, opened up on Folsom Street in 1966, other gay leather bars and establishments catering to this subculture followed creating a foundation for the growing gay leather community. The Stud and the other establishments in this neighborhood created a safe space for gay people to gather, be themselves, and create a community. The Stud was also originally a Hell's Angels hangout; by 1969 it had become a dance bar for hippies on the margins of the leather scene and had a psychedelic black light mural by Chuck Arnett.

Trannyshack 
One of San Francisco's longest running drag shows, Trannyshack, was started in 1996 by Heklina, a well known San Francisco drag queen. Many famous drag queens and celebrities graced the stage at Trannyshack, including many contestants from RuPaul's Drag Race and RuPaul himself. Due to controversy over the use of the word "tranny", the show's name was called into question, prompting Heklina to end it and rebrand. In 2008 Trannyshack ended its run at the Stud.

Honors 
Alexis Muir, a cofounder and former owner of The Stud (see above), was honored in 2017 along with other notables, named on bronze bootprints, as part of San Francisco South of Market Leather History Alley.

The Stud is part of the Leather and LGBTQ Cultural District. The San Francisco Board of Supervisors established the district with legislation signed into law by the mayor on May 9, 2018. A ribbon cutting was held on June 12 that year outside the Stud for that.

References

External links 
 

1966 establishments in California
Leather bars and clubs
LGBT nightclubs in California
South of Market, San Francisco